This is a survey of the postage stamps and postal history of Gibraltar.

Gibraltar is a British overseas territory located at the entrance to the Mediterranean Sea overlooking the Strait of Gibraltar. Gibraltar has historically been an important base for the  British Armed Forces and is the site of a Royal Navy base. The philately of Gibraltar is inexorably linked to its strategic position and military connections.

First stamps
The first stamps specifically marked Gibraltar were stamps of Bermuda overprinted as such and issued in January 1886. Before that British and Spanish stamps were used according to the type of mail and other arrangements were in place before the invention of postage stamps. British stamps used in Gibraltar may be identified by the use of cancels containing the numeral A26 or the letter G in oval bars.

Queen Victoria
From November 1886 Gibraltar had its own stamps including the word Gibraltar in the design with seven values from 1/2d to 1 shilling. From 1889 these stamps were overprinted in centimos until British currency began to be used again in 1898.

The Four Kings 
Between 1903 and 1950 a variety of definitive and commemorative stamps were issued for the reigns of King Edward VII, George V and George VI. No stamps were issued by Gibraltar for King Edward VIII.

Queen Elizabeth II
The first stamp of Gibraltar for the reign of Queen Elizabeth II was the 1/2d Coronation commemorative omnibus stamp issued on 2 June 1953.

The post in Gibraltar is currently run by the Royal Gibraltar Post Office which in 2005 was granted the title of "Royal" by Her Majesty the Queen. Gibraltar is now the only Commonwealth or British Overseas Territory outside the United Kingdom that bears this distinction. The Gibraltar Post Office is now known as the Royal Gibraltar Post Office.

Post & Go stamps for Gibraltar were first issued in 2015.

Postal stationery 

In 1886 three items of postal stationery were issued in Gibraltar by overprinting 2d registered envelopes from Barbados, ½d newspaper wrappers from Natal, ½d postcards from Natal and 1d postcards from St Vincent. The following year the three items of postal stationery were issued inscribed Gibraltar. In 1889 Spanish currency was introduced and all the postal stationery was overprinted with new values in cents. Later the same year all the postal stationery was printed and issued inscribed in the new currency.

In 1898 British currency was reintroduced; all the postal stationery was printed and issued in British currency. Newspaper wrappers were last issued in 1938 and discontinued when stocks run out. Letter cards were briefly available with two issues, one in 1933 and the other in 1938 after which they were discontinued. Envelopes were issued in 1935 only and then discontinued. Aerogrammes were first introduced in 1955.

See also 
Gibraltar Study Circle
Revenue stamps of Gibraltar

References

Further reading
 Burton, R.G.W. Gibraltar: Errors and varieties, 1886-2000. s.l.: Gibraltar Study Circle, 2000 ISBN 0-9509947-3-1
 Chambers, Edmund. Gibraltar: Collecting King George V 1935 Silver Jubilee Issue. Millom: E. Chambers, 2005 ISBN 0-9509947-5-8 88p.
 Chambers, Edmund. Gibraltar: Collecting King George VI: the 1950 new constitution, double overprint. Millom: E. Chambers, 2008 181p.
 Duveen, Geoffrey E. The Postage Stamps of Gibraltar. London: Harris Publications, 1932 59p.
 Garcia, Richard J.M. Looking Back: Anecdotes and Stories about the Gibraltar Post Office 1886-1985. Gibraltar: Gibraltar Philatelic Society, 1985 90p.
 Garcia, Richard J.M. and Edward B. Proud. The Postal History of Gibraltar 1704-1971. Heathfields: Proud-Bailey Co. Ltd., 1998  592p.
 Hine-Haycock, William. Posted in Gibraltar. London: Robson Lowe, 1978 ISBN 0853973741 122p. A 19p. supplement was published in 1983.
 Osborn, Geoffrey. Gibraltar: The Postal History and Postage Stamps. Volume 1: to 1885. Weston-Super-Mare: Gibraltar Study Circle, 1995 ISBN 0-9509947-2-3
 Richardson, Ricky. Gibraltar 1750-1880, A Postal History of the Forwarding Agents operating from "The Rock". London: Vera Trinder Ltd., 1991 20p.
 Rodriquez, José Luis. Gibraltar: The Story of Gibraltar and her Stamps. s.l.: Philatelic Publishers Ltd., 1968 94p.
 Publications of the Gibraltar Study Circle.
 The Rock, journal of The Gibraltar Study Circle.

History of Gibraltar
Postal system of Gibraltar
Philately of Gibraltar